Blue Mountain is a summit in Madison County in the U.S. state of Missouri.

Blue Mountain derives its name from the local Belew family.

References

Mountains of Madison County, Missouri
Mountains of Missouri